Shubert Pereira (born 7 November 1998) is an Indian professional footballer who plays as a midfielder for Churchill Brothers in the I-League.

Career
Shubert Pereira made his professional debut for Churchill Brothers on 10 January 2021 against Indian Arrows as a substitute.

Career statistics

References

1998 births
Living people
Indian footballers
Footballers from Goa
Association football midfielders
I-League players
Gokulam Kerala FC players
Goa Professional League players
Vasco SC players
Churchill Brothers FC Goa players